The 1927 Regis Rangers football team was an American football team that represented Regis College as an independent during the 1927 college football season. The team compiled a 5–3 record and outscored opponents by a total of 101 to 54. Tom McNamara was the head football coach and supervisor of all athletics.

Schedule

References

Regis
Regis Rangers football seasons
Regis Rangers football